Châtelet or Chatelet may refer to:

Châtelet, a type of large gatehouse, a fortified entry point of a castle

Places

Belgium 
 Châtelet, Belgium, a municipality in the province of Hainaut

France 
 Grand Châtelet, a former stronghold with courts, police, and prisons on the site of the Place du Châtelet
 Place du Châtelet, a public square in Paris, on the right bank of the Seine on the border of the 1st and 4th arrondissements
 Théâtre du Châtelet, a theatre in Paris, on the Place du Châtelet
 Châtelet (Paris Métro), a Metro station in Paris, located near the Place du Châtelet
 Châtelet–Les Halles (Paris RER), the central commuter train station in Paris, attached to both the Châtelet and Les Halles metro stations
 Le Châtelet-sur-Meuse, a commune in Haute-Marne that is near the source of the Meuse

Switzerland
 Le Châtelet (mountain), in Switzerland

Other uses
 Châtelet surface, a surface in algebraic geometry

People with the surname
 Albert Châtelet (1883–1960), French mathematician and politician
 Émilie du Châtelet (1706−1749), French mathematician, physicist, and author
 François Châtelet (1925−1985), French historian of political philosophy
 François Châtelet (mathematician) (1912–1987), French mathematician
 Gilles Châtelet (1944–1999), French philosopher and mathematician

See also
 Châtelain (female chatelaine), the French title for the keeper of a castle
 Chastellet, a Templar castle lost to Saladin at the Siege of Jacob's Ford